Humppa is a type of music from Finland. It is related to jazz and very fast foxtrot, played two beats to a bar ( or ). Typical speed is about 220 to 260 beats per minute. Humppa is also the name of a few social dances danced to humppa music. All dances involve bounce that follows the strong bass of the music. In Finnish language, the word humppa can also be used for all social dancing. The name humppa was invented by Antero Alpola for a radio show in the 1950s. He picked it up from German Oktoberfest where the locals used the word to describe the playing of the band. The band probably used a tuba, as the sound of tuba on the first beat is like hump, the second beat coming as a pa. (The related German style is known as oompah.)

There are three different dances typically danced to humppa music, and they have existed long before the word "humppa" was coined. One form of Humppa dance is related to one-step, which arrived in Finland 1913. In this kind of humppa, both dancers take a step on each first beat (on "hump") and progress to the direction of dance. This is danced making turns in closed position or making figures by changing various open positions. The second Humppa form is related to two-step, which came to Finland in 1910. This Humppa has some rhythm and movement from samba and waltz. A third form of dance, Nilkku, is based on a slow, slow, quick, quick rhythm. The first quick step hardly takes any weight and gives the dance an appearance of limping.

In early 1970s pop music and dancing alone almost killed social dancing, but revival of humppa since mid-1970s keeps the traditional social dancing alive.

The revival meant that humppa had become the most popular music and dancing form for older people and also for countryside's youth in the Eastern and South-Eastern parts of the country. Most popular humppa artists from the 1970s include male singers Erkki Junkkarinen, Henry Theel, Mikko Järvinen, Eino Valtanen, Eero Aven, female singers , Eija-Sinikka,  and bands Tulipunaruusut, Kaisa & Kumppanit and Mutkattomat. The most popular humppa event were probably Humppa festivals of Lappeenranta.

See also
Eläkeläiset, a band making humppa covers of famous pop songs.

References

Dance in Finland
Finnish music
Social dance
Finnish dances
Karelian-Finnish folklore